The Armstrong Siddeley Jaguar was an aircraft engine developed by Armstrong Siddeley. The Jaguar was a petrol-fuelled air-cooled 14-cylinder two-row radial engine design.  The Jaguar III was first used in 1923, followed in 1925 by the Jaguar IV and in 1927 by the Jaguar VI. In 1925 the Jaguar became the first production aero engine incorporating a geared supercharger.

Design and development
The Jaguar was developed from the Royal Aircraft Factory RAF.8 design proposal of 1917, and was engineered to use a gear-driven supercharger. First run on 21 June 1922 initial performance was not as expected; as a result the stroke was increased to 5.5 in (139.7 mm) on all variants after the Jaguar I. Throughout its career the Jaguar suffered from vibration due to a lack of a crankshaft centre bearing.

The most powerful version of the engine, the Jaguar VIC, produced a maximum of 490 hp (365 kW) on takeoff at 1,950 rpm and weighed 910 lb (413 kg). The later Lynx was designed using one row of Jaguar cylinders.

Variants
Jaguar I
1922, 300 hp.
Jaguar II
1923, 385 hp, increased stroke, capacity 1,512 cu in (24.8 L).
Jaguar III
1923, 385 hp.
Jaguar IIIA
1923, 380 hp.
Jaguar IV
1925, 385 hp, twin carburettors 
Jaguar IVA
420 hp, Geared propeller drive.
Jaguar IVC
1928, 400 hp, revised connecting rod design, enclosed valve gear.
Jaguar IV(S)
1925, 365 hp, fully supercharged.
Jaguar V
1928.
Jaguar VI
1927.
Jaguar VI(S)
1928, supercharged version of Jaguar VI.
Jaguar VIC
1927, 470 hp, geared propeller drive version of Jaguar VI.
Jaguar VID
1928.
Jaguar VIIA
1929, 400 hp, fully supercharged.
Jaguar VIII
1928, 405 hp, fully supercharged, geared propeller drive

Applications

Airco DH.4
Airco DH.9
Armstrong Whitworth Ajax
Armstrong Whitworth Aries
Armstrong Whitworth Argosy
Armstrong Whitworth Atlas
Armstrong Whitworth Siskin
Armstrong Whitworth Starling
Armstrong Whitworth Wolf
Avro 642
Blackburn Airedale
Blackburn C.A.15C
Blackburn Turcock
Boulton Paul P.71
De Havilland Dormouse
De Havilland DH.50
De Havilland Giant Moth
De Havilland Hyena
Fairey Ferret
Fairey Flycatcher
Fokker C.V
Fokker D.XVI
Gloster Gnatsnapper
Gloster Grebe
Handley Page Hampstead
Hawker Danecock
Hawker Hawfinch
Hawker Hoopoe
Hawker Woodcock
Larkin Lascowl
Martinsyde ADC 1
Nieuport Nighthawk
Parnall Plover
RAAF Experimental Section Warrigal II
Supermarine Air Yacht
Supermarine Nanok
Supermarine Southampton
Vickers Vellore
Vickers Vespa
Vickers Viastra
Vickers Vimy Trainer
Westland Wapiti
Westland Weasel

Engines on display
A preserved Armstrong Siddeley Jaguar is on public display at the Science Museum (London).

Specifications (Jaguar I)

See also

References

Notes

Footnotes

Bibliography

 Lumsden, Alec. British Piston Engines and their Aircraft. Marlborough, Wiltshire: Airlife Publishing, 2003. .

External links

Virtual aviation museum
The Siddeley "Jaguar"s' 17,000 Miles - a 1926 Flight article on the Jaguar's endurance during an London-Cape Town-London flight by Alan Cobham

Aircraft air-cooled radial piston engines
Jaguar
1920s aircraft piston engines